Marzan is a commune in the Morbihan department of Brittany in north-western France. Inhabitants of Marzan are called in French Marzannais.

See also
Communes of the Morbihan department

References

External links

 Mayors of Morbihan Association 

Communes of Morbihan